Hugh McIntyre may refer to:

 Hugh McIntyre (footballer), Scottish footballer
 Hugh McIntyre (farmer), New Zealand farmer and freezing company chairman
 Hugh McIntyre (cricketer), Scottish cricketer